Abū ‘Umar ‘Uthmān b. ‘Umar Mukhtārī Ghaznavī (born c. 467/1074-75, died 513×15/1118×21) was a Persian poet of the Ghaznavids, an empire originating from Ghazna located in Afghanistan. He had patrons at the courts of the Qarakhānids, the Seljūqs of Kirman, and the Ismaili ruler of Tabas.

In the assessment of A. A. Seyed-Gohrab,
in Persian literary history, he is known for his detailed and extensive poetic descriptions (vaṣf) and his interest in literary riddles. His ability lies first of all in the minute description of courtly events such as royal banquets, hunting grounds, battlefields, and Islamic and pre-Islamic Persian festivals.

Originating from Ghazna, he is thought to have written the Shahryar-nama, which describes the struggles of Muslims against Indian heathens during the Ghaznavid era. The epic was composed in 3 years.  Parts of it remain in the British Museum. While at Tabas in 500-508 (1105–13), he composed the Hunar-nāma, dedicating it to the ruler of Tabas, Yamīm al-Dowla, one of the Ismaili aristocrats of Quhistān.

He was a great fan of Masud Sa'd Salman.

References 

 Jan Rypka, History of Iranian Literature.  Reidel Publishing Company. ASIN B-000-6BXVT-K

See also

 List of Persian poets and authors
 Persian literature

12th-century deaths
11th-century Persian-language poets
12th-century Persian-language poets
11th-century Persian-language writers
12th-century writers
Year of birth unknown
11th-century Iranian people
12th-century Iranian people
Ghaznavid-period poets
Year of birth uncertain